Varatra is a monotypic moth genus in the subfamily Lymantriinae erected by Paul Griveaud in 1976. Its only species, Varatra acosmeta, was first described by Cyril Leslie Collenette in 1939. It is found on Madagascar.

References

Lymantriinae
Monotypic moth genera